Michael Siani (born July 16, 1999) is an American professional baseball outfielder for the Cincinnati Reds of Major League Baseball (MLB).

Early life and amateur career
Siani grew up in Glenside, Pennsylvania and attended William Penn Charter School. As a senior, he batted .361 with two home runs, 11 RBIs, and 19 stolen bases.

Professional career
Siani was selected in the fourth round of the 2018 Major League Baseball draft by the Cincinnati Reds. He signed with the team and received a $2 million signing bonus. After signing with the team Siani was assigned to the Greeneville Reds of the Low-A Appalachian League, where he slashed 288 /.351/ .386 with two home runs and 13 RBIs in 46 games played. He spent the 2019 season with the Dayton Dragons of the Single-A Midwest League and hit .253 with six home runs, 39 RBIs and 45 stolen bases. Siani returned to Dayton, now a High-A team, in 2021 and batted .216. He was assigned to the Double-A Chattanooga Lookouts at the start of the 2022 season. Siani batted .252 with 12 home runs, 19 doubles, seven triples, 49 RBIs and 49 stolen bases in 121 games before receiving a late-season promotion to the Triple-A Louisville Bats.

The Reds selected Siani's contract on September 22, 2022, and promoted him to the active roster. He made his Major League debut later that day, starting in center field and going 0-3 in a 5-1 loss against the Milwaukee Brewers.

Siani was optioned to Triple-A Louisville to begin the 2023 season.

Personal life
Siani's younger brother, Sammy, plays in the Pittsburgh Pirates organization.

References

External links

1999 births
Living people
Baseball players from Pennsylvania
Major League Baseball outfielders
Cincinnati Reds players
Greeneville Reds players
Dayton Dragons players
Chattanooga Lookouts players
Louisville Bats players
William Penn Charter School alumni
Surprise Saguaros players